Efrain Cruz Gaytán (born 1 November 1978 in Tomatlán), known as Efraín Cruz, is a former Mexican footballer.

Career
The midfielder has been with Ascenso MX side Irapuato FC for several seasons since 2008.

Honours

Club
Irapuato
 Liga de Ascenso: Clausura 2011

Notes

References

External links
 
 
 
 
 

1978 births
Living people
Association football midfielders
Liga MX players
Ascenso MX players
C.D. Guadalajara footballers
Club Puebla players
Club Tijuana footballers
Irapuato F.C. footballers
Footballers from Jalisco
Mexican footballers